Total Xanarchy is the debut studio album by American rapper Lil Xan. It was released on April 6, 2018, by Columbia Records. The album features guest appearances from Charli XCX, YG, Rae Sremmurd, 2 Chainz, Diplo, Yo Gotti, Rich the Kid, and Steven Cannon.

It was supported by five singles: "Slingshot", "Betrayed", "Far", "Wake Up" and  "Color Blind". Total Xanarchy was panned by both music critics and listeners, with most criticizing the lyrical content and Leanos' overall performance.

Background
The album was originally titled No Love after Xan's single of the same name, but was changed after his management decided not to include the song on the album. It was originally scheduled for a March 17, 2018 release, however the album was delayed.

On March 2, 2018, during an interview with Ebro Darden during the Ebro in the Morning show, Xan explained the direction of the album's sound and style, by stating,

On March 15, 2018, the album's artwork and release date was revealed through the rapper's Instagram story.

Singles
The album's lead single, "Slingshot" was released on April 2, 2017. The JP-directed music video was originally released on June 21, 2017, however it was re-uploaded on November 22, 2017.

The album's second single, "Betrayed" was released for streaming and digital download on July 20, 2017. The Cole Bennett-directed music video was released on August 28, 2017. The music video has reached over 285 million views on YouTube.

The album's third single, "Far" was released on November 3, 2017. Its music video was released on October 31, 2017.

The album's fourth single, "Wake Up" was released on December 27, 2017. The Cole Bennett-directed music video was released on December 30, 2017.

The album's fifth single, a collaboration with producer Diplo, titled "Color Blind" was released on March 22, 2018. A music video for the song was released on April 10, 2018.

Promotional singles
The album's lead promotional single, "Betrayed (Remix)" with Yo Gotti and Rich the Kid was released on March 15, 2018.

The album's second promotional single, "The Man" featuring Steven Cannon was released on March 30, 2018, along with the Steve King-directed music video.

Promotion

Tour
On December 18, 2017, Lil Xan announced an official headlining concert tour to further promote the album titled Total Xanarchy Tour. The tour began on January 25, 2018, in Vancouver, at Venue Nightclub.

Critical reception

Total Xanarchy was panned by music critics, with most criticizing the lyrical content and Leanos' overall performance. Ben Beaumont-Thomas from The Guardian gave credit to the tracks containing strong hooks and "fine, gothic production", but criticized Xan for mimicking the technical abilities of XXXTentacion ("Diamonds") and Post Malone ("Far") and lacking in lyricism, saying "I can confidently report that there are no good lyrics on this album." Pitchfork writer Meaghan Garvey said about Lil Xan overall, "On his debut album, the standard-bearer of the sad-rap movement refuses to reveal much in the way of emotion at all, aside from a kind of sullen, conflicted defiance."

Track listing
Credits adapted from Tidal.

Notes
  signifies a co-producer
  signifies an uncredited co-producer
 "Color Blind" features background vocals from Thomas Azie
 The CD version of the album does not include the songs "Shine Hard" and "Betrayed (Remix)".

Personnel
Credits adapted from Tidal.

Technical
 DJ Fu – recording , mixing 
 Steve Hybicki – mixing 
 Mauricio "Veto" Iragorri – mastering 
 Steven "B" Baughman – mastering 
 Kinfolk John – mixing , recording 
 Nolan Presley – recording 
 Finis "KY" White – mixing 
 Ben the Great – mixing 
 Boaz De Jong – mixing 
 Mike Bell – mastering

Charts

Certifications

References

2018 debut albums
Lil Xan albums
Columbia Records albums
Albums produced by Diplo
Albums produced by Ronny J
Albums produced by Symbolyc One
West Coast hip hop albums